Mass for the Healing of the World is a live album by American jazz double bassist William Parker & the Little Huey Creative Music Orchestra which was recorded live in 1998 but not released on the Italian Black Saint label until 2003.

Reception

In his review for All About Jazz, Rex Butters states "One wonders how many recorded Little Huey performances languish in the can. This one documents a night six years ago that is both timeless and a time capsule. Like all Little Huey projects, all manner of musics emanate from the assembled musicians, all the musics tinted blue".

Track listing
All compositions by William Parker
 Invocation – 0:30
 "First Reading (Dawn Song)" – 13:22
 "Hallelujah" – 8:46
 "Mysticism" – 5:44
 "Response (Muezzin's Call)" – 13:00
 "Second Reading (Cathedral in the Mountains)" – 6:55
 "Willows (Can You Give Me Back My Life)" – 8:36
 "Cantos (Love God)" – 13:55

Personnel
William Parker – bass, pocket cornet
Roy Campbell, Jr., Lewis Barnes, Richard Rodriguez – trumpet
Alex Lodico, Masahiko Kono – trombone
Dave Hofstra – tuba
Assif Tsahar – tenor sax, bass clarinet
Darryl Foster – soprano sax, tenor saxophone
Rob Brown, Marco Eneidi – alto sax
Chris Jonas – soprano sax
Dave Sewelson – baritone sax
Cooper-Moore – piano
Susie Ibarra – drums, timpani
Aleta Heyes – vocals

References

2004 live albums
Black Saint/Soul Note live albums
William Parker (musician) live albums